The Chairman of the Constitutional Court of the Russian Federation, is the presiding judge of the Constitutional Court of Russia.

Appointment
Initially, the Chairman of the Constitutional Court was elected by the judges of the court for three years. However, in 2009, such elections were canceled and the Chairman became appoint by the Federation Council. Also, until 2020, only a judge of the Constitutional Court could be appointed Chairman of the Court. In 2020, this requirement was lifted.

Currently, the Chairman of the Constitutional Court is nominated by the President of Russia and appointed by the Federation Council for a six years.

After the expiration of his term of office, the Chairman of the Constitutional Court may be re–appointed to his office. The maximum number of terms during which the Chairman can hold office is not set.

The Chairman of the Constitutional Court is not subject to the restriction that a person who has reached the age of 70 cannot be a judge.

Powers
In accordance with the Federal Constitutional Law "On the Constitutional Court of Russia", the Chairman of the Court has the following powers:

directs the preparation of sessions of the Constitutional Court of Russia, convenes them and presides over them;
submits to the Constitutional Court issues to be considered in its sessions;
represents the constitutional Court in relations with state bodies and organizations, public associations, and makes statements on its behalf under the authority of the constitutional Court;
provides General guidance for the staff of the constitutional Court, submits for approval of the constitutional Court of Candidature chief of staff and head of the Secretariat of the constitutional Court, the Secretariat, the size and structure of the apparatus.

The Chairman of the Constitutional Court also administers the oath of office of the President of Russia. But this is a tradition, rather than a responsibility of the Chairman of the Court. The Constitution or other federal legislation does not require that the oath be administered by anyone in particular, simply that it be taken by the president.

List

See also
Chief Justice of the Russian Federation

References

Russia
Lists of legal professionals
1991 establishments in Russia
 
Constitutions of Russia